Tatyana Ter-Mesrobyan (born 12 May 1968) is a Russian long jumper of Armenian descent. Her personal best is 7.06 metres, achieved in May 2002 in St-Peterburg.

Achievements

References

External links

1968 births
Living people
Russian female long jumpers
Soviet female long jumpers
Russian people of Armenian descent
Russian masters athletes